The Seen and Unseen is a 2017 drama film directed and written by Kamila Andini.

Cast
Ni Kadek Thaly Titi Kasih as Tantri
Ida Bagus Putu Radithya Mahijasena as Tantra
Ayu Laksmi as Mother
I Ketut Rina as Father
Happy Salma as Nurse Ida
Gusti Ayu Raka as Grandmother

Release
The Seen and Unseen had its world premiere at the Toronto International Film Festival in September 2017, competing for the Platform Prize. The film received lively applause from the audience during the world premiere. The film had its Asian premiere at the 22nd Busan International Film Festival during the program, A Window on Asian Cinema. The film was also screened at the 68th Berlin International Film Festival during the Generation program as its European premiere.

The film was theatrically released nationwide on 8 March 2018.

Reception
On the review aggregator website Rotten Tomatoes, 100% of eight critics' reviews are positive, with an average rating of 9.3/10.

Elizabeth Kerr of The Hollywood Reporter praised Andini's interpretation of child trauma and called the film "a quietly powerful portrait of childhood grief". Maggie Lee of Variety described the film as a "haunting and hypnotic interpretation of the child subconscious rooted in Balinese arts and culture".

Accolades

References

2017 films
2017 drama films
Indonesian drama films
2010s Indonesian-language films
Films directed by Kamila Andini
Citra Award winners
Films about families
Films about twins
Films about death
Films set in Bali